The rock festival Vía de la Plata was held in 2008 in the city of Mérida, Spain.

On its first edition, that was the 11 July 2008, the headliner and first announced band of the show is the British heavy metal band Iron Maiden. Other confirmed bands are Slayer, Iced Earth, Avenged Sevenfold, Lauren Harris, Rose Tattoo, Barón Rojo, Ra and Iced Earth, after the cancellation of the show of Mägo de Oz.

Lineups

External links
 Via de la Plata Festival website

Notes and references

Rock festivals in Spain
2008 in music
Music festivals established in 2008
Heavy metal festivals in Spain